9-Crown-3, also called 1,4,7-trioxonane or 1,4,7-trioxacyclononane is a crown ether with the formula (C2H4O)3.  A colorless liquid, it is obtained in low yield by the acid-catalyzed oligomerization of ethylene oxide.  

In contrast to larger crown ethers (12-crown-4, and 18-crown-6), 9-crown-3 has elicited very little interest, except from theorists.

See also
1,4-Dioxane

References 

Crown ethers
Tridentate ligands
Nine-membered rings